Oldoy is a rural locality (a settlement) in Takhtamygdinsky Selsoviet of Skovorodinsky District, Amur Oblast, Russia. The population was 21 as of 2018.

Geography 
Oldoy is located 45 km west of Skovorodino (the district's administrative centre) by road. Takhtamygda is the nearest rural locality.

References 

Rural localities in Skovorodinsky District